The Boomtown Historic District comprises the western and southern portions of Martinsburg, West Virginia, generally along the alignments of West King Street and Winchester Avenue, following the general path of the town's electric streetcar system. It includes a former industrial section of the town, home to a number of textile mills, as well as the housing that was built for mill workers.

Boomtown's central core is along Virginia, West Virginia and Faulkner Avenues, centering on the fountain at Virginia and Faulkner.  The area consists of primarily middle-class Victorian-style houses, in contrast to the more modest working-class houses on the opposite side of Winchester Avenue. The greatest building activity took place after 1891, when the Martinsburg Mining and Manufacturing Company developed the area in conjunction with the opening of streetcar service.

Industrial buildings include the former homes of the Shenandoah Pants Company, Brooklyn Brass Works and the Interwoven Mills. The Crawford Woolen and Cashmere Mills stand along Stephen Street.

The area was designated a historic district in 1980. It includes the separately-listed Abell-Kilbourn House.

References

Greek Revival architecture in West Virginia
Historic districts in Martinsburg, West Virginia
Houses on the National Register of Historic Places in West Virginia
Industrial buildings and structures on the National Register of Historic Places in West Virginia
Queen Anne architecture in West Virginia
Shingle Style architecture in West Virginia
Victorian architecture in West Virginia
Houses in Berkeley County, West Virginia
Historic districts on the National Register of Historic Places in West Virginia